Lamelas is a former civil parish in the municipality of Santo Tirso, Portugal. In 2013, the parish merged into the new parish Lamelas e Guimarei. It is located 6 km south of the city of Santo Tirso in the Leça Valley, is an agriculture center.

References

Former parishes of Santo Tirso